The Johnstown Symphony Orchestra (JSO) is a symphony orchestra based in Johnstown, Pennsylvania.  The symphony was founded in January 1929, and conducts a program of six subscription concerts from October to May plus four special events, including an annual Symphony Gala. The orchestra performs primarily at the University of Pittsburgh at Johnstown's Pasquerilla Performing Arts Center. James Blachly was recently named the 12th Music Director.

Music Directors
James Blachly, named Music Director in 2016, is also the Music Director of the Experiential Orchestra  and the Geneva Light Opera.

(1929–1932) Hans Roemer
(1932–1935) Silvio Landino
(1935–1944) Theodore Koerner
(1944–1951) Russell Gerhart
(1951–1955) Manfred Kuttner
(1955-1956) Donald Johanos
(1956-1958) David McNaughton
(1958-1961) Manfred Kuttner
(1961–1969) Phillip Spurgeon
(1969–1973) Michael Semanitzky
(1973–1983) Donald Barra
(1983–2015) Istvan Jaray
(2016–present) James Blachly

See also
List of symphony orchestras in the United States

External links
JSO Official Site
UPJ Arts - Pasquerilla Performing Arts Center
James Blachly Official Site

References

Musical groups established in 1929
Orchestras based in Pennsylvania
Johnstown, Pennsylvania